A list of horror films released in the 1920s.

List

See also
 Lists of horror films

References

Citations

Bibliography

 
 
 
 
 
 
 
 

1920s
Horror